Vounargo is a village in the municipal unit of Iardanos, Elis, Greece. Since the 2011 local government reform it is part of the municipality Pyrgos. Vounargo was the seat of the former municipality Iardanos. It is situated at the foot of low hills to the north. It is 8 km northwest of Pyrgos, 9 km southeast of Amaliada and 11 km west of Karatoula. In 2011, the population of the village was 778.

Population

References

External links
GTP Vounargo

Populated places in Elis